Carmen Valdés (Carmen Laura Valdés Capote; born November 23, 1954) is a retired sprinter from Cuba, who won an Olympic bronze medal in 4 x 100 metres relay in Munich 1972.

References

 

Cuban female sprinters
1954 births
Living people
Olympic athletes of Cuba
Olympic bronze medalists for Cuba
Athletes (track and field) at the 1972 Summer Olympics
Athletes (track and field) at the 1976 Summer Olympics
Medalists at the 1972 Summer Olympics
Athletes (track and field) at the 1971 Pan American Games
Athletes (track and field) at the 1975 Pan American Games
Olympic bronze medalists in athletics (track and field)
Pan American Games medalists in athletics (track and field)
Pan American Games silver medalists for Cuba
Central American and Caribbean Games gold medalists for Cuba
Competitors at the 1974 Central American and Caribbean Games
Central American and Caribbean Games medalists in athletics
Medalists at the 1971 Pan American Games
Medalists at the 1975 Pan American Games
Olympic female sprinters
People from San José de las Lajas
20th-century Cuban women